Surge is the third studio album by Canadian singer-songwriter Jane Child, released in 2002 by her own record label Sugarwave.

Reception
Allmusic's Robert L. Doerschuk gave the album four stars of five stars, commenting that "Child's talent is formidable, her willingness to take risks is laudable -- and the price she pays for it all in the marketplace with Surge is, unfortunately, predictable."

Track listing

Personnel
Musicians
 Jane Child – lead vocals, keyboards, guitars
 Cat Gray – drums, synthesizer

Production
 Jane Child – arrangement, production
 Cat Gray – mixing
 Stephen Marcussen – mastering

References

External links
 
 

2002 albums
Jane Child albums
Self-released albums